Chionodes perissosema is a moth in the family Gelechiidae. It is found in Argentina.

References

Chionodes
Moths described in 1932
Moths of South America